R.S.V.P. (Rare Songs, Very Personal) is a 2004 album by Nancy Wilson, featuring Wilson in duet with George Shearing, Toots Thielemans, Phil Woods, and Gary Burton. At the 47th Grammy Awards, Wilson won the Grammy Award for Best Jazz Vocal Album, for her performance on this album.

Track listing
 "An Older Man (Is Like an Elegant Wine)" (Lee Wing) – 4:37
 "Day In, Day Out" (Rube Bloom, Johnny Mercer) – 3:21
 "Why Did I Choose You" (Michael Leonard, Hugh Martin) – 5:11
 "I Wish I'd Met You" (Richard Rodney Bennett, Johnny Mandel, Frank Underwood) – 4:59
 "I Let a Song Go Out of My Heart" (Duke Ellington, Irving Mills, Henry Nemo) – 3:20
 "Goodbye" (Gordon Jenkins) – 4:18
 "How About Me?" (Irving Berlin) – 5:16
 "Minds of Their Own (Dois Corregos)" (Peter Eldridge, Ivan Lins, Caetano Veloso) – 4:13
 "Little Green Apples" (Bobby Russell) – 4:39
 "You'll See" (Carroll Coates) – 5:08
 "That's All" (Alan Brandt, Bob Haymes) – 3:32
 "Blame It on My Youth" (Edward Heyman, Oscar Levant) – 4:31

Charts

Personnel

Performance
Nancy Wilson – vocals
Arranged by Darmon Meader (track: 5), Jay Ashby (tracks: 6, 7, 8, 11), Johnny Pate (track: 1), Llew Matthews (tracks: 3, 9, 10), Dr. John Wilson (track: 2)

Alto Saxophone – Andres Boiarsky (tracks: 2, 5), Andy Snitzer (tracks: 2 5), Mike Tomaro (tracks: 2, 5)
Arranged By [Strings] – Jay Ashby (tracks: 3)
Backing Vocals – Jay Ashby (tracks: 4), Kim Nazarian (tracks: 4)
Baritone Saxophone – Jim Germann (tracks: 2, 5)
Bass – Dwayne Dolphin (tracks: 1, 3, 4, 6 to 11), Rufus Reid (tracks: 2, 5)
Bass Clarinet – Jim Germann (tracks: 2, 5), Mike Tomaro (tracks: 7)
Cello – David Premo (tracks: 3)
Clarinet – Andy Snitzer (tracks: 2, 5, 7), Mike Tomaro (tracks: 2, 5)
Drums – Jamey Haddad (tracks: 1, 3, 4, 6 to 11), Lewis Nash (tracks: 2, 5)
Flute – Andres Boiarsky (tracks: 2, 5), Eric DeFade (tracks: 2, 5), Mike Tomaro (tracks: 7)
Guitar – Marty Ashby (tracks: 2, 5, 8)
Keyboards – Ivan Lins (tracks: 8), Jay Ashby (tracks: 6)
Percussion – Jay Ashby (tracks: 6)
Piano – Llew Matthews (tracks: 1 to 4, 6 to 11)
Tenor Saxophone – Andy Snitzer (tracks: 2, 5), Eric DeFade (tracks: 2, 5)
Trombone – Gary Piecka (tracks: 2, 5), Jay Ashby (tracks: 2, 5), Mike Davis* (tracks: 2, 5)
Trombone [Bass] – Max Seigel (tracks: 2, 5)
Trumpet – Dennis Reynolds (tracks: 2, 5), Jim Hynes* (tracks: 2, 5), Steve Hawk (tracks: 2, 5)
Viola – Tatjana Mead Chamis (tracks: 3)
Violin – Andrés Cárdenes (tracks: 3)

References

2004 albums
Nancy Wilson (jazz singer) albums
Albums arranged by Johnny Pate
Grammy Award for Best Jazz Vocal Album
MCG Jazz albums
Vocal jazz albums